Ilimotama Jese (born 16 March 1990) is a Fijian footballer who plays as a defender for Nadi F.C. in the Fijian National Football League.

References

1990 births
Living people
Fijian footballers
Association football defenders
Fiji international footballers
Nadi F.C. players
2016 OFC Nations Cup players